exp4j is a small Java library for evaluation of mathematical expressions. It implements Dijkstra's Shunting-yard algorithm to translate expressions from infix notation to Reverse Polish notation and calculates the result using a simple Stack algorithm.

Features
 Variables can be used in expressions
 exp4j comes with a set of common built-in functions
 Users can create and use their own custom operators
 Users can create and use their own custom functions

License terms
exp4j is released under the terms of the Apache License 2.0

Examples of usage
Calculating the result of

can be done in the following way:
Expression e = new ExpressionBuilder("3 * (sin(pi) - 2 )/ e")
        .variables("pi", "e")
        .build()
        .setVariable("pi", Math.PI)
        .setVariable("e", Math.E);
double result = e.evaluate();

See also
 Shunting-yard algorithm – Explanation of the Shunting-yard algorithm by Edsger Dijkstra
 Reverse Polish notation - Allows Stack based algorithms to evaluate expressions
 Apache License 2.0 - Version 2 of the Apache Software License
 mXparser - Mathematical Expressions Parser / Evaluator

References

Java (programming language) libraries